The Caves of Barać are located near the village of Nova Kršlja in the municipality of Rakovica, Croatia.  In 1892 the caves were opened to visitors but subsequently abandoned and forgotten following World War II. In July 2004 the Upper Caves of Barać were reopened to visitors.

The caves are named after a certain Barać who was a fighter against the Ottomans. According to a legend the caves bear the name of the victory of Barać at the caves. The surname of Barać does not exist anymore in this region.

External links
 The Caves of Barać - official website
 Pictures of the Caves of Barać

Caves of Croatia
Limestone caves
Landforms of Karlovac County
Karst formations of Croatia
Show caves in Croatia
Kordun